The Very Best of Tracy Lawrence is a 2007 compilation  album by country music artist Tracy Lawrence. It is his third greatest-hits album. This compilation comprises 21 of his top ten singles, arranged in chronological order, from his 1991 debut "Sticks and Stones" to 2003's "Paint Me a Birmingham". Of the songs on this album, only the 1994 single "Renegades, Rebels and Rogues" (from the soundtrack to the 1994 film Maverick) was not previously included on one of Lawrence's studio releases.  The album has sold 348,900 copies in the United States as of April 2017.

Track listing
"Sticks and Stones" (Roger Dillon, Elbert West) - 3:36
"Today's Lonely Fool" (Kenny Beard, Stan Paul Davis) - 3:49
"Runnin' Behind" (Mark D. Sanders, Ed Hill) - 2:53
"Somebody Paints the Wall" (Tommy Smith, Charles Browder, Elroy Kahanek, Nelson Larkin) - 3:15
"Alibis" (Randy Boudreaux) - 3:02
"Can't Break It to My Heart" (Tracy Lawrence, Kirk Roth, Earl Clark, West) - 2:54
"My Second Home" (Lawrence, Paul Nelson, Kenny Beard) - 2:45
"If the Good Die Young" (Nelson, Craig Wiseman) - 2:27
"Renegades, Rebels and Rogues" (Larry Boone, Nelson, Clark) - 2:37
"I See It Now" (Boone, Nelson, Woody Lee) - 3:36
"As Any Fool Can See" (Nelson, Beard) - 3:03
"Texas Tornado" (Bobby Braddock) - 3:30
"If the World Had a Front Porch" (Lawrence, Nelson, Beard) - 3:05
"If You Loved Me" (Nelson, Tom Shapiro) - 3:21
"Time Marches On" (Braddock) - 3:03
"Stars over Texas" (Lawrence, Nelson, Beard) - 3:34
"Is That a Tear" (Beard, John Jarrard) - 3:18
"Better Man, Better Off" (Stan Paul Davis, Brett Jones) - 3:36
"How a Cowgirl Says Goodbye" (Lawrence, Nelson, Boone) - 3:30
"Lessons Learned" (Lawrence, Nelson, Boone) - 2:57
"Paint Me a Birmingham" (Buck Moore, Gary Duffy) - 3:48

Personnel

 Flip Anderson – piano
 Eddie Bayers – drums, percussion
 Bruce Bouton – steel guitar
 Dennis Burnside – Hammond organ, piano
 Larry Byrom – acoustic guitar
 Mark Casstevens – acoustic guitar, harmonica, hi-string guitar
 Deryl Dodd – background vocals
 Dan Dugmore – steel guitar
 Shannon Forrest – drums
 Paul Franklin – Dobro, steel guitar, pedabro
 Sonny Garrish – dobro, steel guitar
 Jack Gavin – drums
 Rob Hajacos – fiddle, "assorted hoedown tools"
 Tony Harrell – keyboards, piano
 Aubrey Haynie – fiddle, mandolin
 Rick Huckaby – acoustic guitar, background vocals
 Dann Huff – electric guitar
 Tracy Lawrence – lead vocals
 Chris Leuzinger – electric guitar
 B. James Lowry – acoustic guitar
 Gary Lunn – bass guitar
 Terry McMillan – harmonica, percussion
 Liana Manis – background vocals
 Brent Mason – acoustic guitar, electric guitar, gut string guitar
 Steve Nathan – keyboards, piano
 Dave Pomeroy – bass guitar
 Brent Rowan – acoustic guitar, electric guitar, mandolin, soloist
 John Wesley Ryles – background vocals
 Hank Singer – fiddle
 Milton Sledge – drums
 Gary Smith – keyboards, piano, synthesizer
 Joe Spivey – fiddle, Archguitar
 James Stroud – drums, percussion
 Biff Watson – acoustic guitar
 Dennis Wilson – background vocals
 Lonnie Wilson – drums, percussion
 Glenn Worf – bass guitar
 Curtis Wright – background vocals
 Curtis Young – background vocals

Charts

References

Tracy Lawrence albums
Rhino Records compilation albums
2007 greatest hits albums